Précis is the debut full-length album by Portland, Oregon based musician Benoît Pioulard, released by Kranky on October 16, 2006.

Background 
Before the release of this album, Pioulard already had a fairly substantial discography. This included many self-released albums on CD-R and cassette, as well as the 7-inch EP Enge, which was put out by Moodgadget in 2005. He later signed a deal with Chicago label Kranky, from which this album was released.

Handmade version 
An elaborate handmade version of this album was released through his Myspace profile in September 2006.

Limited to only 25 copies, this edition had exclusive content not available on the standard release and due to high demand sold out rapidly.

Critical reception 
Précis was generally very well received by critics. Stylus Magazine was one of the first publications to review the album, remarking:

AllMusic, who named Pioulard a "Hot Artist" in December 2006, were also impressed with the album, saying:

Track listing
 "La Guerre de Sept Ans" – 3:08
 "Together & Down" – 3:07
 "Ext. Leslie Park" – 2:42
 "Triggering Back" – 2:30
 "Moth Wings" – 1:16
 "Alan & Dawn" – 2:50
 "Corpus Chant" – 1:43
 "Palimend" – 3:04
 "Coup de Foudre" – 1:31
 "Hirondelle" – 2:22
 "Needle & Thread" – 2:42
 "R Coloring" – 0:39
 "Sous la Plage" – 2:59
 "Patter" – 2:58
 "Ash into the Sky" – 3:18

Music videos
On December 6, 2006, a video for Triggering Back was released. It was directed by Adam Hunt and was posted on both Pioulard's Myspace profile and his official website.

Themes in the video generally revolve around photography and nature. It shows Pioulard travelling around various locations and taking Polaroid photographs of his surroundings, which then fall to the ground. Featuring a mixture of close-up shots and distant views, it is a hazy, almost dreamlike video that seems to fit with the style of the song and its ephemeric lyrical focus.

View the video in QuickTime format here

References

External links
Various reviews of the album

Benoit Pioulard albums
Kranky albums
2006 albums